St David's, Cardiff is a shopping centre in Cardiff city centre.

Saint David's, Cardiff or St David's, Cardiff may also refer to:

Buildings
 St David's Hall, a concert hall in Cardiff city centre
 St David's Hospital, Cardiff, a hospital in Riverside, west of the city centre
 Voco St David's Cardiff Hotel, a 5-star hotel in Cardiff Bay

Churches
 Cardiff Metropolitan Cathedral, also known as St David's Cathedral Cardiff, the Roman Catholic cathedral
 Eglwys Dewi Sant, Cardiff, a church now dedicated to St David, in St Andrew's Crescent
 St David's Church, Fairwater

Cardiff